Rab GDP dissociation inhibitor beta is a protein that in humans is encoded by the GDI2 gene.

GDP dissociation inhibitors are proteins that regulate the GDP-GTP exchange reaction of members of the rab family, small GTP-binding proteins of the ras superfamily, that are involved in vesicular trafficking of molecules between cellular organelles.  GDIs slow the rate of dissociation of GDP from rab proteins and release GDP from membrane-bound rabs.  GDI2 is ubiquitously expressed.  The GDI2 gene contains many repetitive elements indicating that it may be prone to inversion/deletion rearrangements.

References

Further reading